Olivia Lum Ooi Lin is a Singaporean businesswoman. She is best known for being the founder, group chief executive officer, and president of the Singapore-based Hyflux Group. She also heads the Research and Development function.

Early life
Lum was adopted at birth, and never knew her biological parents; she was brought up by a woman she called her "grandmother". When Lum was only three, her grandmother gambled away her savings; they lost the house in which they were living, and moved to a shack without running water. She came to Singapore at the age of 15 and enrolled at the Tiong Bahru Secondary School, where she supported herself through tutoring and sales jobs. She went on to study at Hwa Chong Junior College and graduated in 1986 with an Honours degree in chemistry from the Faculty of Science of the National University of Singapore.

Career
Lum started corporate life as a chemist with Glaxo Pharmaceutical. After working for three years at Glaxo, she left in 1989 at the age of 28 to start up Hydrochem, the precursor to Hyflux, with just SG$20,000 of capital, which she raised by selling her condominium and car. She hired three employees at the start; Lum herself rode around on a motorcycle selling her company's water filters and treatment chemicals. By January 2001, Hyflux had become the first water treatment company to be listed on SESDAQ, and was upgraded to the Singapore Exchange's Mainboard in April 2003. By 2005, she had a net worth of over US$240 million, which earned her a place as the only woman on Forbes' "Southeast Asia Rich List".

Lum holds several positions in public service. She is a board member of SPRING Singapore, the National University Singapore Council, and the Singapore Exchange, as well as the president of the Singapore Water Association. She is also a member of the UNESCAP Business Advisory Council and the Singapore Green Plan 2012 coordinating committee. Lum was a Nominated Member of Parliament in the Parliament of Singapore from 2 July 2002 to 1 January 2005. In 2003, she was awarded the International Management Action Award, followed by the Global Female Invent and Innovate Award the following year.

On 3 October 2008, Lum resigned her position as independent non-executive director of the Singapore Exchange and relinquished her position on the audit, regulatory conflicts and remuneration committees of the Exchange, according to the Exchange's filing. She stated this was due to her heavy work commitments in line with Hyflux's rapid expansion, and that her resignation would enable her to focus more time and resources on Hyflux's growth.

In 2011, Lum was named Ernst & Young World Entrepreneur Of The Year.

In 2013, Lum was appointed to the board at International Enterprise Singapore (IE Singapore)

In 2014 she was appointed the board of Singapore Technologies Engineering (ST Engineering). In 2018, Lum resigned from this position citing business commitments as her reason for resignation.

In May 2018, Hyflux applied to the Singapore High Court for a 30-day protection against creditor claims to allow the company time to reorganize its liabilities. Following this voluntary filing, Lum announced a series of three townhall meetings with the company's 50,000 plus retail shareholders. In July, Lum announced that efforts would be made to “ensure that the company stays viable.” Lum also noted that Hyflux had total debt of $1.17 billion.

References

External links

Life Story and Image Gallery of Olivia Lum

Hwa Chong Junior College alumni
National University of Singapore alumni
Living people
Malaysian chemists
Malaysian women chemists
Malaysian chief executives
Malaysian people of Chinese descent
Malaysian emigrants to Singapore
Malaysian women in business
Naturalised citizens of Singapore
People from Perak
Singaporean Charismatics
Singaporean chemists
Singaporean chief executives
Singaporean people of Chinese descent
Singaporean Nominated Members of Parliament
Singaporean women in business
Singaporean women chemists
Year of birth missing (living people)
Winners of the Nikkei Asia Prize